Eupithecia illepidus is a moth in the family Geometridae. It is found in Argentina.

References

Moths described in 1992
illepidus
Moths of South America